The Entylomatales are an order of smut fungi in the class Exobasidiomycetes. A monotypic order, it consists of a single family, the Entylomataceae. Both the family and order were circumscribed in 1997.

References

Ustilaginomycotina
Basidiomycota orders
Monotypic fungus taxa
Taxa described in 1997